Gobbo is an Italian surname meaning "hunchback". Notable people with the surname include:

 Antonio Roque Gobbo (born 1935), Brazilian writer
 Gian Paolo Gobbo (born 1949), Italian politician
 Sir James Gobbo (1931-2021), Australian jurist, 25th Governor of Victoria
 Nicola Gobbo (born 1972), Australian lawyer
 Renzo Gobbo (born 1961), Italian footballer and manager
 Nickname for fans of Juventus F.C.

Fictional characters:
 Launcelot Gobbo, a clown in Shakespeare's play The Merchant of Venice
 Old Gobbo, father of Launcelot Gobbo, also in The Merchant of Venice

See also

Cristoforo Solari, also known as il Gobbo
 Gobbo, a goblin character in the Noddy books by Enid Blyton
 Gobbo, a goblin character in the children's TV series based on the books, Make Way for Noddy
 Gobbos, furry creatures found in the video game Croc: Legend of the Gobbos and its sequel

 Goblin (disambiguation)

Italian-language surnames

it:Gobbo